Per Weichel (born 16 April 1942) is a Danish former sports shooter. He competed at the 1968 Summer Olympics and the 1972 Summer Olympics.

References

1942 births
Living people
Danish male sport shooters
Olympic shooters of Denmark
Shooters at the 1968 Summer Olympics
Shooters at the 1972 Summer Olympics
Sportspeople from Copenhagen